Kunzea rostrata is a species of flowering plant in the myrtle family, Myrtaceae and is endemic to an area along the south west coast of Western Australia. It is a shrub with small, mostly elliptic leaves and with groups of between mostly eleven and fifteen rose pink flowers mainly on the ends of branches that continue to grow after flowering.

Description
It has more or less spherical groups of flowers on the ends of branches that continue to grow after flowering. There are usually between eleven and fifteen rose pink flowers in the groups. Flowering occurs in October and November and the fruit is an urn-shaped capsule.<ref name="JABG">{{cite journal |last1=Toelken |first1=Hellmut R. |title=A revision of the genus Kunzea"" (Myrtaceae) 1. The Western Australian section Zeanuk |journal=Journal of the Adelaide Botanic Gardens |date=1996 |volume=17 |pages=62–6x}}</ref>

Taxonomy and namingKunzea rostrata was first formally described in 1996 by Hellmut R. Toelken and the description was published in Journal of the Adelaide Botanic Garden. The specific epithet (rostrata'') is a word Latin meaning "beaked", referring to the point on the tip of the sepals.

Distribution and habitat
This kunzea is only known from the area between Cape Naturaliste peninsula and Cowaramup Bay near Gracetown, often found growing in grey sands or peaty soils along the coast.

References

rostrata
Endemic flora of Western Australia
Myrtales of Australia
Rosids of Western Australia
Plants described in 1996
Taxa named by Hellmut R. Toelken